Ten Worlds may refer to:

 The ten spiritual realms of Mahāyāna Buddhism
 Tales of Ten Worlds, a story collection by Arthur C. Clarke
 Ten Worlds Productions, a television production company
 Ten Worlds, Ten Directions, an art exhibit by Lindy Lee shown in 2002